Andy Samuel Griffith (June 1, 1926 – July 3, 2012) was an American actor, comedian, television producer, southern gospel singer and writer whose career spanned seven decades in music and television. Known for his Southern drawl, his characters with a folksy-friendly personality, as well as his gruff but friendly voice, Griffith was a Tony Award nominee for two roles. He gained prominence in the starring role in director Elia Kazan's film A Face in the Crowd (1957) and No Time for Sergeants (1958) before he became better known for his television roles, playing the lead roles of Andy Taylor in the sitcom The Andy Griffith Show (1960–1968) and Ben Matlock in the legal drama Matlock (1986–1995).

Early life and education
Griffith was born on June 1, 1926, in Mount Airy, North Carolina, the only child of Carl Lee Griffith and his wife, Geneva (née Nunn). As a baby, Griffith lived with relatives until his parents could afford to buy a home. With neither a crib nor a bed, he slept in dresser drawers for several months. In 1929, when Griffith was three, his father began working as a helper or carpenter and purchased a home in Mount Airy's "blue-collar" south side. Griffith grew up listening to music. By the time he entered school, he was well aware that he was from what many considered the "wrong side of the tracks". He was a shy student, but once he found a way to make his peers laugh, he began to come out of his shell and come into his own.

As a student at Mount Airy High School, Griffith cultivated an interest in the arts, and he participated in the school's drama program. A growing love of music, particularly swing, would change his life. Griffith was raised Baptist and looked up to Ed Mickey, a minister at Grace Moravian Church, who led the brass band and taught him to sing and play the trombone. Mickey nurtured Griffith's talent throughout high school until graduation in 1944. Griffith was delighted when he was offered a role in The Lost Colony by Paul Green, a play about Roanoke Island still performed today. He performed as a cast member of the play for several years, playing a variety of roles until he finally landed the role of Sir Walter Raleigh, for whom North Carolina's capital is named.

He attended the University of North Carolina (UNC) in Chapel Hill, North Carolina, and graduated with a Bachelor of Music degree in 1949. He began college studying to be a Moravian preacher, but he changed his major to music and became a part of the school's Carolina Playmakers. At UNC, he was president of the UNC chapter of Phi Mu Alpha Sinfonia, America's oldest fraternity for men in music. He also played roles in several student operettas, including The Chimes of Normandy (1946), and Gilbert and Sullivan's The Gondoliers (1945), The Mikado (1948) and H.M.S. Pinafore (1949). After graduation, he taught music and drama for a few years at Goldsboro High School in Goldsboro, North Carolina, where he taught, among others, Carl Kasell. He also began to write.

Career

From rising comedian to film star
Griffith's early career was as a monologist, delivering long stories such as What It Was, Was Football, which is told from the point of view of a naïve country preacher trying to figure out what was going on in a football game. The monologue was released as a single in 1953 on the Colonial Records label, and was a hit for Griffith, reaching number nine on the charts in 1954.

Griffith starred in Ira Levin's one-hour teleplay, No Time for Sergeants (March 1955) — a story about a country boy in the United States Air Force — on The United States Steel Hour, a television anthology series. He expanded that role in Ira Levin's full-length theatrical version of the same name (October 1955) on Broadway in New York City. The role earned him a "Distinguished Supporting or Featured Dramatic Actor" nomination at the 1956 Tony Awards, losing to Ed Begley. He did win the 1956 Theatre World Award, however, a prize given for debut roles on Broadway. "Mr. Griffith does not have to condescend to Will Stockdale" (his role in the play), wrote Brooks Atkinson in The New York Times. "All he has to do is walk on the stage and look the audience straight in the face. If the armed forces cannot cope with Will Stockdale, neither can the audience resist Andy Griffith."

Griffith later reprised his role for the film version (1958) of No Time for Sergeants; the film also featured Don Knotts, as a corporal in charge of manual-dexterity tests, marking the beginning of a lifelong association between Griffith and Knotts. No Time for Sergeants is considered the direct inspiration for the later television situation comedy Gomer Pyle, U.S.M.C. – a spin-off of The Andy Griffith Show.

His only other New York stage appearance was the title role in the 1959 musical Destry Rides Again, co-starring Dolores Gray. The show, with a score by Harold Rome, ran for 472 performances and more than a year. Griffith was nominated for "Distinguished Musical Actor" at the 1960 Tony Awards, losing to Jackie Gleason. He also portrayed a US Coast Guard sailor in the feature film Onionhead (1958). It was neither a critical nor a commercial success.

Dramatic role in A Face in the Crowd (1957)

In 1957, Griffith made his film debut starring in the film A Face in the Crowd. He plays a "country boy" who is manipulative and power-hungry: a drifter who becomes a television host and uses his show as a gateway to political power. The film was directed by Elia Kazan and written by Budd Schulberg and co-stars Patricia Neal, Walter Matthau, Tony Franciosa, and Lee Remick (in her film debut).

A 2005 DVD reissue of A Face in the Crowd includes a mini-documentary on the film, with comments from Schulberg and cast members Griffith, Franciosa, and Neal. In his interview, Griffith recalls Kazan prepping him to shoot his first scene with Remick's teenaged baton twirler, who captivates Griffith's character on a trip to Arkansas. Griffith also expresses his belief that the film was more popular in more recent decades than it was when originally released.

Television roles

Early television roles
Griffith's first appearance on television was in 1955 in the one-hour teleplay of No Time for Sergeants on The United States Steel Hour. That was the first of two appearances on that series. In 1960, Griffith appeared as a county sheriff, who was also a justice of the peace and the editor of the local newspaper, in an episode of Make Room for Daddy starring Danny Thomas. This episode, in which Thomas's character is stopped for running a stop sign in a little town, served as a backdoor pilot for The Andy Griffith Show. Both shows were produced by Sheldon Leonard.

The Andy Griffith Show (1960–1968)

Beginning in September 1960, Griffith starred as Sheriff Andy Taylor in The Andy Griffith Show for the CBS television network. The show took place in the fictional town of Mayberry, North Carolina, where Taylor, a widower, was the sheriff and town sage. The show was filmed at Desilu Studios, with exteriors filmed at Forty Acres in Culver City, California.

From 1960 to 1965, the show co-starred character actor and comedian — and Griffith's longtime friend — Don Knotts in the role of Deputy Barney Fife, Taylor's best friend and comedy partner. He was also Taylor's cousin in the show at first, though later they dropped that cousin relationship and talked simply of knowing one another since boyhood. In the series premiere episode, in a conversation between the two, Fife calls Taylor "Cousin Andy", and Taylor calls Fife "Cousin Barney". The show also starred child actor Ron Howard (then known as Ronny Howard), who played Taylor's only child, Opie Taylor. It was an immediate hit. Griffith never received a writing credit for the show, but he worked on the development of every script. Knotts was frequently lauded and won multiple Emmy Awards for his comedic performances, as did Frances Bavier in 1967, while Griffith was never nominated for an Emmy Award during the show's run.

In 1967, Griffith was under contract with CBS to do one more season of the show. However, he decided to quit the show to pursue a movie career and other projects. The series continued as Mayberry R.F.D., with Ken Berry starring as a widower farmer and many of the regular characters recurring, some regularly and some as guest appearances. Griffith served as executive producer (according to Griffith, he came in once a week to review the week's scripts and give input) and guest starred in five episodes (the pilot episode involved his marriage to Helen Crump). He made final appearances as Taylor in the 1986 reunion television film, Return to Mayberry, with fellow co-star, Don Knotts. Two reunion specials followed in 1993 and 2003, with strong ratings.

Matlock (1986–1995)
After leaving his still-popular show in 1968, and starting his own production company Andy Griffith Enterprises in 1972, Griffith starred in less-successful television series such as Headmaster (1970), The New Andy Griffith Show (1971), Adams of Eagle Lake (1975), Salvage 1 (1979) and The Yeagers (1980). After spending seven months in rehabilitation for leg paralysis from Guillain–Barré syndrome in 1983, Griffith returned to television as the title character, Ben Matlock, in the legal drama Matlock (1986–1995) on NBC and ABC. Matlock was a country lawyer in Atlanta, Georgia, who was known for his Southern drawl and for always winning his cases. Matlock also starred unfamiliar, struggling actors (both of whom were childhood fans of Andy Griffith) Nancy Stafford as Michelle Thomas (1987–1992) and Clarence Gilyard, Jr. as Conrad McMasters (1989–1993). By the end of its first season it was a ratings powerhouse on Tuesday nights. Although the show was nominated for four Emmy Awards, Griffith once again was never nominated. He did, however, win a People's Choice Award in 1987 for his work as Matlock.

Other television appearances
Griffith also made other character appearances through the years on Playhouse 90, Gomer Pyle, U.S.M.C., The Mod Squad, Hawaii Five-O, The Doris Day Show, Here's Lucy, The Bionic Woman and Fantasy Island, among many others. He also reprised his role as Ben Matlock on Diagnosis: Murder in 1997, and his final guest-starring role was in 2001 in an episode of Dawson's Creek.

Films (including television films)

For most of the 1970s, Griffith starred or appeared in many television films, including The Strangers In 7A (1972), Go Ask Alice (1973), Winter Kill (1974) and Pray for the Wildcats (1974), which marked his first villainous role since A Face in the Crowd. Griffith appeared again as a villain in Savages (1974), a television film based on the novel Deathwatch (1972) by Robb White. He appeared as The Father in a 1976 PBS television adaptation, directed by Stacy Keach, of Luigi Pirandello's Six Characters in Search of an Author. Griffith received his only Primetime Emmy Award nomination as Outstanding Supporting Actor – Miniseries or a Movie for his role as the father of a murder victim in the television film Murder in Texas (1981) and won further acclaim for his role as a homicidal villain in the television film Murder in Coweta County (1983), co-starring music legend Johnny Cash as the sheriff. He also appeared in several television miniseries, including the television version of From Here to Eternity (1979), Roots: The Next Generations (1979), Centennial (1978), and the Watergate scandal-inspired Washington: Behind Closed Doors (1977), playing a former president loosely based on Lyndon B. Johnson.

Most of the television movies in which Griffith starred were also attempts to launch a new series. Winter Kill (1974) launched the short-lived Adams of Eagle Lake, which was canceled in 1975 after only two episodes. A year later, he starred as a New York City attorney for the DA's office in Street Killing, which also failed to launch a new show. Two television films for NBC in 1977, The Girl in the Empty Grave and Deadly Game, were attempts for Griffith to launch a new series featuring him as Police Chief Abel Marsh, a more hard-edged version of Andy Taylor; despite strong ratings, both were unsuccessful in leading to a new TV show.

During this period, Griffith also appeared in two feature films, both of which flopped at the box office. He co-starred with Jeff Bridges as a crusty old 1930s western actor in the comedy Hearts of the West (1975), and he appeared alongside Tom Berenger as a gay villainous colonel and cattle baron in the Western comedy spoof Rustlers' Rhapsody (1985). 

Following another short-lived return to series television, playing a family patriarch in the Dynasty-inspired The Yeagers in 1980, Griffith continued to make guest appearances in several hit series, including Hotel, Fantasy Island, where he played a fictional version of western figure Judge Roy Bean featured in an aspiring singer's fantasy, and an episode of The Love Boat, which featured a memorable appearance by pop icon Andy Warhol. He also appeared as an attorney in the NBC miniseries Fatal Vision (1984), which is considered a precursor to his role in Matlock.

Griffith stunned many unfamiliar with his A Face in the Crowd work in the television film Crime of Innocence (1985)...wherein he portrayed a hateful and vindictive judge who routinely sentenced juveniles to hard prison time, followed by lengthy and equally-torturous probation. Also noteworthy in Griffith's darker roles was his character in Under the Influence (1986), a TV movie in which Griffith played an alcoholic, abusive patriarch. He further surprised audiences with his role as a dangerous and mysterious grandfather in the television film Gramps (1995) co-starring John Ritter. He also appeared as a comical villain in the spy movie spoof Spy Hard (1996) starring Leslie Nielsen. In the television film A Holiday Romance (1999), Griffith played the role of Jake Peterson. In the film Daddy and Them (2001), Griffith portrayed the patriarch of a dysfunctional southern family.

In the feature film Waitress (2007), Griffith played a crusty diner owner who takes a shine to Keri Russell's character. His last appearance was the leading role in the romantic comedy, independent film Play the Game (2009) as a lonely, widowed grandfather re-entering the dating world after a 60-year hiatus. The cast of Play the Game also included Rance Howard, Ron Howard's real-life father, who had made appearances in various supporting roles on The Andy Griffith Show, and Clint Howard, Ron's younger brother, who had the recurring role of Leon (the kid offering the ice cream cone or peanut butter sandwich) on The Andy Griffith Show.

Singing and recording career
Griffith sang as part of some of his acting roles, most notably in A Face in the Crowd and in many episodes of both The Andy Griffith Show and Matlock. In addition to his recordings of comic monologues in the 1950s, he made an album of upbeat country and gospel tunes during the run of The Andy Griffith Show, which included a version of the show's theme sung by Griffith under the title "The Fishin' Hole". In recent years, he recorded successful albums of classic Christian hymns for Sparrow Records. His most successful was the release I Love to Tell the Story: 25 Timeless Hymns (1996), which was certified platinum by the RIAA. The album won Grammy Award for Best Southern, Country or Bluegrass Gospel Album at the 1997 Grammy Awards.

Griffith appeared in country singer Brad Paisley's music video "Waitin' on a Woman" (2008).

Name dispute
William Harold Fenrick of Platteville, Wisconsin, legally changed his name to Andrew Jackson Griffith and ran unsuccessfully for sheriff of Grant County in November 2006. Subsequently, actor Griffith filed a lawsuit against Griffith/Fenrick, asserting that he violated trademark, copyright, and privacy laws by changing his name for the "sole purpose of taking advantage of Griffith's fame in an attempt to gain votes". On May 4, 2007, US District Court Judge John C. Shabaz ruled that Griffith/Fenrick did not violate federal trademark law because he did not use the Griffith name in a commercial transaction but instead in order "to seek elective office, fundamental First Amendment protected speech".

Association with Don Knotts and Ron Howard

Don Knotts

Griffith's friendship with Don Knotts began in 1955 when they co-starred in the Broadway play No Time for Sergeants. Several years later, Knotts had a regular role on The Andy Griffith Show for five seasons. Knotts left the series in 1965, but periodically returned for guest appearances. He appeared in the pilot for Griffith's subsequent short-lived series, The New Andy Griffith Show, and he had a recurring role on Matlock, from 1988 to 1992. In a January 2000 interview, Griffith said of Knotts, "The five years we worked together were the best five years of my life."

They kept in touch until Knotts' death in early 2006. Griffith traveled from his Manteo, North Carolina, home to Los Angeles to visit the terminally ill Knotts at Cedars-Sinai just before Knotts died of lung cancer.

Ron Howard

Griffith's friendship with child actor Ron Howard began in 1960 when they guest-starred in the episode of Make Room For Daddy that led to the formation of The Andy Griffith Show the same year. For eight seasons, they starred together in most of the show's episodes, portraying father and son.

They guest-starred together in the show's spin-off series Mayberry R.F.D. They appeared in an episode during which Griffith's character married his long-time girlfriend, Helen Crump, and in the Gomer Pyle U.S.M.C. episode "Opie Joins the Marines", in which Howard's character, Opie, runs away from home and attempts to enlist in the US Marines. They co-starred in the TV special Return to Mayberry (1986), in which the now-adult Opie is about to become a father. They later appeared together in CBS reunion specials in 1993 and 2003.  Griffith also made a comedy cameo on the Saturday Night Live program of October 9, 1982, hosted by Howard, who was, by then, in the early years of his directing career.

In October 2008, Griffith and Howard briefly reprised their Mayberry roles in an online video Ron Howard's Call to Action. It was posted to comedy video website Funny or Die. The video encouraged people to vote and endorsed Democratic candidates Barack Obama and Joe Biden.

After Griffith's death, Howard stated: "His love of creating, the joy he took in it whether it was drama or comedy or his music, was inspiring to grow up around. The spirit he created on the set of The Andy Griffith Show was joyful and professional all at once. It was an amazing environment. And I think it was a reflection of the way he felt about having the opportunity to create something that people could enjoy. It was always with respect and passion for the opportunity and really what it could offer people in a very unpretentious and earthy way. He felt he was always working in service of an audience he really respected and cared about. He was a great influence on me. His passing is sad. But he lived a great rich life." In a 2016 interview with US Magazine, Howard recalled Griffith encouraging his scriptwriting when he was just seven years old, saying "I felt elated." Howard recounted: "Andy Griffith said, 'What are you grinnin' at, young'un?' I said, 'That's the first idea of mine they've taken.' He said, 'It's the first that was any damn good. Now let's rehearse!'"

Political activities
In 2000, Griffith appeared in a last-minute campaign commercial where he endorsed then-Attorney General Mike Easley for governor of the state of North Carolina. Easley had been locked in a tight race with former Mayor of Charlotte Richard Vinroot and had been losing his lead in the polls. Easley went on to win that November, taking 52% of the vote to Vinroot's 46%. Many observers dubbed Easley's victory as the "Mayberry Miracle", and credit Griffith's endorsement for stopping his falling poll numbers.

In October 2008, Griffith appeared with Ron Howard in a Funny or Die video endorsement for Barack Obama's presidential campaign.

In addition to his online video with Howard in 2008, in politics Griffith favored Democrats and recorded television commercials endorsing North Carolina governors Mike Easley and Bev Perdue. He spoke at the inauguration ceremonies of both. In 1989, he declined an offer by Democratic party officials to run against Jesse Helms, a Republican U.S. Senator from North Carolina.

In July 2010, he also starred in advertisements about Medicare.

Personal life
In 1945, while a student at the University of North Carolina, Griffith was initiated as a member of Phi Mu Alpha Sinfonia, a national social music fraternity for men.

Griffith and Barbara Bray Edwards were married on August 22, 1949, and they adopted two children: a son named Andy Samuel Griffith Jr. (born in 1957 and better known as Sam Griffith) and a daughter named Dixie Nann Griffith. They divorced in 1972. Sam, a real-estate developer, died in 1996 after years of alcoholism. The senior Griffith's second wife was Solica Cassuto, a Greek actress. They were married from 1973 to 1981. Griffith and Cindi Knight married on April 12, 1983, after they met when he was filming Murder in Coweta County. Griffith also had three granddaughters through his daughter Dixie.

According to the 2015 book Andy & Don: The Making of a Friendship and a Classic American TV Show, Aneta Corsaut and Griffith had an affair while Griffith was married and they were working together on The Andy Griffith Show.

Health and death
Griffith's first serious health problem was in April 1983 when he was diagnosed with Guillain–Barré syndrome and could not walk for seven months because of paralysis from the knees down.

On May 9, 2000, he underwent quadruple heart-bypass surgery at Sentara Norfolk General Hospital in Norfolk, Virginia.

After a fall, Griffith underwent hip surgery on September 5, 2007, at Cedars-Sinai Medical Center in Los Angeles.

On July 3, 2012, Griffith died at his coastal home in Manteo, North Carolina, from a heart attack he had had the day before; he was 86. His death certificate listed hypertension, coronary artery disease, and hyperlipidemia as underlying health conditions. In accordance with prior arrangements, no services were held at the time, and he was buried at the family cemetery on the island within five hours of his death.

Awards and honors

 Television Hall of Fame inductee (class of 1991)
 Star on the Hollywood Walk of Fame
 Andy Griffith Museum—a 2,500-square-foot (232 m2) facility which houses the world's largest collection of Griffith memorabilia—opened on September 26, 2009, in Mount Airy, North Carolina
 Grammy Award for Best Southern, Country or Bluegrass Gospel Album for I Love to Tell the Story – 25 Timeless Hymns in 1997
 Grammy Award nominations for Best Comedy Album (Hamlet in 1960) and Best Southern, Country or Bluegrass Gospel Album (Just As I Am in 1999)
 Country Gospel Music Hall of Fame inductee (class of 1999)
 A  stretch of US Highway 52 that passes through Mount Airy rededicated as the Andy Griffith Parkway
 Statue of Griffith and Ron Howard (as Andy and Opie) constructed in Pullen Park in Raleigh, North Carolina
 A second statue was later erected in Andy Griffith's hometown of Mount Airy of Andy and Opie outside the Andy Griffith museum.
 Andy Griffith signature model guitar commissioned by C.F. Martin & Company
 Presidential Medal of Freedom (2005)
 Christian Music Hall of Fame inductee (class of 2007)
 North Carolina Music Hall of Fame inductee (class of 2010)

Albums

Filmography

Features

Short subjects

Television work

References

External links

 Inventory of the Andy Griffith Papers, 1949–1997, in the Southern Historical Collection, University of North Carolina at Chapel Hill
 
 
 
 
 
 Andy Griffith Discography, at MTV

1926 births
2012 deaths
20th-century American comedians
20th-century American male actors
20th-century American male singers
20th-century American male writers
20th-century American singers
21st-century American comedians
21st-century American male actors
American gospel singers
American male comedians
American male film actors
American male singer-songwriters
American male television actors
American male voice actors
American performers of Christian music
American television producers
Burials in North Carolina
Colonial Records
Comedians from North Carolina
Deaths from coronary artery disease
Deaths from hypertension
Grammy Award winners
Male actors from North Carolina
North Carolina Democrats
People from Manteo, North Carolina
People from Mount Airy, North Carolina
People with Guillain–Barré syndrome
Presidential Medal of Freedom recipients
Schoolteachers from North Carolina
Singer-songwriters from North Carolina
Southern gospel performers
University of North Carolina at Chapel Hill alumni
Writers from North Carolina